Long Road Out of Eden is the seventh and most recent studio album by American rock band the Eagles, released in 2007 on Lost Highway Records as their first ever double album. Nearly six years in production, it is the band's first studio album since 1979's The Long Run. In between that time the band recorded four original studio tracks for the live album Hell Freezes Over (1994), "Hole in the World" for The Very Best Of (2003) and the Joe Walsh-penned "One Day at a Time" for the Farewell 1 Tour: Live from Melbourne DVD (2005), which Walsh later re-recorded for his 2012 album Analog Man.

It is the band's first album released following the dismissal of Don Felder in 2001, as well as their final album with Glenn Frey before his death in 2016.

The album produced two singles on the Hot Country Songs charts: a cover of J.D. Souther's "How Long" and "Busy Being Fabulous", both of which were Top 30 hits on the country charts as well as Top 20 hits on the Hot Adult Contemporary Tracks charts. The album produced five straight hits on the Hot Adult Contemporary Tracks charts with "How Long", "Busy Being Fabulous", "No More Cloudy Days", "What Do I Do With My Heart", and "I Don't Want to Hear Anymore".

The album debuted at No. 1 in the US after a last-minute rule change by Billboard (which also blocked Britney Spears' highly anticipated Blackout from topping the chart) and won the band two Grammy awards for "How Long" and the instrumental "I Dreamed There Was No War". The album became the band's sixth consecutive No. 1 album, and was the highest selling album of the year. It has since sold 3.5 million copies in the US alone. Being a double album with length exceeding 90 minutes, the album was certified 7× Platinum by the Recording Industry Association of America for shipments of 7 million discs.

Album information
According to Henley, Bill Szymczyk, who had produced their previous albums, was a producer on the album, although  Henley described Szymczyk's role as that of "a mediator, a consigliere, a ringmaster" since they (Frey and Henley) had already learned how to produce records themselves.

Three studio versions of songs from Long Road Out of Eden: "No More Cloudy Days", "Do Something" and "Fast Company" were first released in 2006 in a bonus CD of a special edition exclusive to Wal-Mart of the DVD release, Farewell 1 Tour-Live from Melbourne.

On August 20, 2007, the song "How Long", written by J.D. Souther – who had previously worked with the Eagles co-writing some of their biggest hits including "Best of My Love", "Victim of Love", "Heartache Tonight" and "New Kid in Town" – was released as a single to radio with an accompanying online video at Yahoo! Music and debuted on television on CMT during the Top 20 Countdown on August 23, 2007. The band performed the song as part of their live sets in the early to mid-1970s, but did not record it at the time due to J.D. Souther's desire to use it on his first solo album.

The deluxe collector's edition of Long Road Out of Eden was released on November 20, 2007, featuring two bonus tracks, "Hole in the World" and "Please Come Home for Christmas". This version of the CD is wrapped in a red linen cloth, screen printed with panoramic imagery, and includes a 40-page booklet with lyrics, credits, exclusive photos and desert scenes from the making of the "How Long" video.

"No More Walks in the Wood" is a song using the words from "An Old-Fashioned Song", a 21-line poem (without choruses either in the poem or song) by John Hollander. The song is in four-part harmony with guitar chords, but mostly sung a cappella.

In a 2007 interview with CNN, band member Don Henley declared, "This is probably the last Eagles album that we'll ever make." When questioned about the possibility of a follow-up album in November 2010, band member Timothy B. Schmit said, "My first reaction would be: no way. But I said that before the last one, so you never really know. Bands are a fragile entity and you never know what's going to happen. It took a long time to do that last album, over a span of years, really, and it took a lot out of us. We took a year off at one point. I'm not sure if we're able to do that again. I wouldn't close the door on it, but I don't know." In a 2010 interview with undercover.fm, Joe Walsh said that the band might be able to make one more album before the band "wraps it up".

At the 2009 Grammy Awards, the album won Best Pop Instrumental Performance and was nominated for three more: Best Pop Vocal Album; Best Pop Performance by a Duo or Group With Vocals for "Waiting in the Weeds"; and Best Rock Performance by a Duo or Group With Vocals for "Long Road Out of Eden".

"Guilty of the Crime" was previously recorded by the Bellamy Brothers on their 1997 album Over the Line. In 2009, they recorded a version with the Bacon Brothers and released it as a single, with a music video starring Shannen Doherty.

In 2009 "I Don't Want to Hear Any More" was released as the fifth single from the album. The song's writer Paul Carrack had already cut his own version, with Henley and Schmit singing backing vocals, in 2007.

For the first year after the album's initial release, the album was available in North America exclusively via the band's website, or through Wal-Mart and Sam's Club retail stores.  It became the first account-exclusive album to reach number 1. The album blocked Britney Spears' Blackout from hitting number one, ending her record-breaking streak of number-one albums as all previous four opened at the helm.

Tour

Track listing

Personnel
As listed in CD booklet.

Eagles
 Glenn Frey – guitars, keyboards, vocals, bass guitar
 Don Henley – drums, vocals, percussion, guitars
 Joe Walsh – guitars, keyboards, vocals
 Timothy B. Schmit – bass guitar, vocals

Additional personnel
 Steuart Smith – guitar, keyboards, mandolin
 Scott Crago – drums, percussion
 Richard F.W. Davis – keyboards, programming
 Michael Thompson – keyboards, accordion, trombone
 Will Hollis – keyboards
 Al Garth – alto saxophone, violin
 Bill Armstrong – trumpet
 Chris Mostert – tenor and alto saxophone
 Greg Smith – baritone saxophone
 Greg Leisz – pedal steel
 Lenny Castro – percussion
 Luis Conte – percussion
 Orchestrations by Richard F.W. Davis and Glenn Frey
 Horns arranged by Greg Smith and Don Henley

Production
 Produced by Eagles
 Co-Producers: Steuart Smith, Richard F.W. Davis, Scott Crago and Bill Szymczyk
 Engineering: Chris Bell, Mike Terry, Jim Nipar and Mike Harlow
 Additional Engineering: Andy Ackland
 Mixed by Elliot Scheiner at The Doghouse, Los Angeles, California
 Digital editing: Blade
 Recorded at The Doghouse, Los Angeles, California and Samhain Sound, Malibu, California
 Additional Studios:
 O’Henry Studios, Burbank, California
 Henson Recording Studios, Hollywood, California
 Mooselodge, Calabasas, California
 The Panhandle House, Denton, Texas
 Luminous Sound, Dallas, Texas
 Mastered by Bob Ludwig at Gateway Mastering, Portland, Maine
 Art direction and Design: Jeri Heiden
 Logo: Nick Steinhardt / Smog Design
 Photography: Olaf Heine

Charts

Weekly charts

Year-end charts

Certifications and sales

Awards

Wins

Nominations

References

External links
The Billboard Q&A: The Eagles' Glenn Frey, Billboard, October 12, 2007
The Billboard Q&A: The Eagles' Don Henley, Billboard, October 12, 2007

2007 albums
Eagles (band) albums
Lost Highway Records albums
Albums produced by Bill Szymczyk